Frederick Curry may refer to:
Fred Curry, American professional wrestler
Fred Curry (politician)

See also
Frederick Currie (disambiguation)
Frederick Currey, English rugby player
Curry (surname)
Currie (surname)